Heroldrebe is a red German wine grape variety produced by crossing Blauer Portugieser and Lemberger. It was created by August Herold at the grape breeding institute in Weinsberg in the Württemberg region in 1929, and was named after him.

One of Heroldrebe's drawbacks is its relatively late ripening; it is harvested at about the same time as Pinot noir. In Palatinate it is typically used to produce light, almost pinkish, colored wines.

Synonyms
The only synonyms of Heroldrebe is its breeding code We S 130 or Weinsberg S 130.

Offspring
Heroldrebe was later crossed with Helfensteiner by Herold to produce Dornfelder, which has become the most widely planted of the grape varieties created by Herold. Hegel is also Helfensteiner × Heroldrebe.

References

Red wine grape varieties